Night of the Eagle is a 1962 British horror film directed by Sidney Hayers. The script by Charles Beaumont, Richard Matheson and George Baxt was based upon the 1943 Fritz Leiber novel Conjure Wife. The film was retitled Burn, Witch, Burn! for the US release.

Plot
Norman Taylor (Peter Wyngarde) is a psychology professor lecturing about belief systems and superstition. After a scene in which his wife searches frantically and finds a poppet left by a jealous work rival, he discovers that his wife, Tansy (Janet Blair), is practising obeah, referred to in the film as "conjure magic", which she learned in Jamaica. She insists that her charms have been responsible for his rapid advancement in his academic career and for his general well-being. A firm rationalist, Norman is angered by her acceptance of superstition. He forces her to burn all her magical paraphernalia.

Almost immediately things start to go wrong: a female student (Judith Stott) accuses Norman of rape, her boyfriend (Bill Mitchell) threatens him with violence, and someone tries to break into the Taylors' home during a thunderstorm. Tansy, willing to sacrifice her life for her husband's safety, almost drowns herself and is only saved at the last minute by Norman giving in to the practices he despises.

Tansy attacks him with a knife while in a trance, but Norman disarms her and locks her in her room. Her limping walk during the attack gives Norman a clue to the person responsible for his ill luck: university secretary Flora Carr (Margaret Johnston), the wife of Lindsay whose career had stalled in favour of Norman's. Flora uses witchcraft to set fire to the Taylor home with Tansy trapped inside.

Using a form of auditory hypnosis over a loudspeaker system, Flora convinces Norman that a giant stone eagle perching at the top of the university chapel has come to life to attack him. Lindsay arrives at the office and turns off the loudspeaker, and the illusory eagle vanishes. Tansy escapes her burning home and rejoins her no longer sceptical  husband. On their way out of the campus, Lindsay sees the chapel's heavy doors are ajar (left thus by Norman in his "escape" from the eagle), and insists on securing them despite Flora's protests. As she waits for him, the eagle statue falls from the roof and kills her.

Cast
Peter Wyngarde - Norman Taylor
Janet Blair - Tansy Taylor
Margaret Johnston - Flora Carr
Anthony Nicholls - Harvey Sawtelle
Colin Gordon - Lindsay Carr
Kathleen Byron - Evelyn Sawtelle
Reginald Beckwith - Harold Gunnison

Background
Fritz Leiber's Conjure Wife was first published (in shorter form) in 1943 in Unknown magazine and as a single book in 1953. For Night of the Eagle, the New England setting of the novel was changed to rural Britain. Weird Woman (1944, starring Lon Chaney Jr.) and Witches' Brew (1979, starring Teri Garr, Richard Benjamin, and Lana Turner) were also based on Conjure Wife.

Witchcraft had been a recurring theme in the horror genre, though often in combination with Therianthropy (humans turning into animals as in Cat People or The Wolf Man) or Voodoo myths (White Zombie, I Walked with a Zombie). Night of the Eagle depicts the use of charms or supernatural powers in an “everyday” environment and juxtaposes it with a rationalist view which is questioned during the progress of events. Jacques Tourneur's Night of the Demon (1957), to which William K. Everson compared it unfavourably, works in a similar way.

Production
Richard Matheson and Charles Beaumont were admirers of the novel and wanted to work on something together, so the two men decided to adapt it. They were paid $5,000 each by James H. Nicholson of AIP, who passed the project over to AIP's regular co-producers, Anglo-Amalgamated in England. They agreed to finance, allocating the movie to Independent Artists to produce. Producer Albert Fennell bought in George Baxt to work on the script. The original script (commenced by Matheson and completed by Beaumont) was published in the Gauntlet Press edition of He Is Legend, a Matheson tribute anthology, but not in the subsequent paperback.

All three authors involved in Night of the Eagle's screenplay were prolific writers for film and television specializing in horror, mystery and science fiction. Charles Beaumont and Richard Matheson in particular were repeatedly hired to adapt (though freely) the works of Edgar Allan Poe and H. P. Lovecraft for the screen, and both were prolific writers for The Twilight Zone.

Filming took six weeks. Part of the deal of Anglo-Amalgamated financing was that a star play the lead; Peter Cushing was originally meant to star but decided to make Captain Clegg instead. Musical comedy star Janet Blair came on board and the male lead was rumoured to have been offered to both Peter Finch and Cushing; Finch turned the part down and Cushing was unwell at the time the film was due to go into production. Peter Wyngarde was cast at the last minute.

While the film was accessible to an under-aged audience in the US., it was rated "X" (adults only) in the UK on its initial release. It was later re-rated 15, then 12 for UK home video releases.

Film prints for the US release were preceded by a narrated prologue in which the voice of Paul Frees was heard to intone a spell to protect the audience members from evil. For protection, American theatre audiences were given a special pack of salt and words to an ancient incantation.

Reception
While not universally regarded as a classic by critics, Night of the Eagle received mostly sympathetic reviews:

The New York Times called Night of the Eagle "quite the most effective 'supernatural' thriller since Village of the Damned" and perhaps the "best outright goose-pimpler dealing specifically with witchcraft since I Walked with a Zombie...in 1943" and noted:
Simply as a suspense yarn, blending lurid conjecture and brisk reality, growing chillier by the minute, and finally whipping up an ice-cold crescendo of fright, the result is admirable. Excellently photographed (not a single "frame" is wasted), and cunningly directed by Sidney Hayers, the incidents gather a pounding, graphic drive that is diabolically teasing. The climax is a nightmarish hair-curler but, we maintain, entirely logical within the context.

Jonathan Rosenbaum of the Chicago Reader called the film "atmospheric and underplayed in the tradition of Val Lewton" and, despite judging Sidney Hayers' direction as "needlessly rhetorical at times", "eerily effective".

Film historian William K. Everson, though critical of Night of the Eagle for its predictability, found good words for the story and Janet Blair's performance.

David Pirie of Time Out magazine, while not happy with the casting of Janet Blair, acknowledged Hayers' direction "an almost Wellesian flourish" and the script being "structured with incredible tightness".

Author S. T. Joshi declared it particularly notable for its realistic portrayal of campus politics.

In 1963 Night of the Eagle was nominated for the Hugo Award for Best Dramatic Presentation.

Home media
The following DVD releases were available in 2011:
Night of the Eagle, UK 2007, Optimum Releasing
Burn, Witch, Burn!, US 2011, MGM (DVD-R "on demand").
Out of print are the 1995 US Image DVD, US-Laserdisc and VHS video titled Burn, Witch, Burn!, the British DVD-Box titled Horror Classics, consisting of The Masque of the Red Death, Night of the Eagle and Zoltan...Hound Of Dracula, and the British VHS video Night of the Eagle.

Kino Lorber released Burn, Witch, Burn on Blu-ray in the US on August 18, 2015.

References

External links

 
 
 
 

1962 films
1962 horror films
British black-and-white films
British horror films
Films shot at Associated British Studios
American International Pictures films
Films about academia
Films based on American novels
Films directed by Sidney Hayers
Films shot in England
Films with screenplays by Charles Beaumont
Films with screenplays by Richard Matheson
Films about witchcraft
Films scored by William Alwyn
1960s English-language films
1960s British films